Jailhouse Rock is an EP by American singer Elvis Presley, featuring songs from the movie of the same name. It was released by RCA Victor, with catalogue EPA 4114, on October 30, 1957. Recording sessions took place at Radio Recorders in Hollywood on April 30 and May 3, 1957, with an additional session at the Metro-Goldwyn-Mayer Soundstage in Hollywood on May 9 for "Don't Leave Me Now". It peaked at #1 on the newly inaugurated Billboard EP chart where it remained at #1 for 28 weeks. The EP album was the best selling EP album of 1958 according to Billboard.

Content
Unlike Loving You (1957) but like Love Me Tender (1956), a full long-playing album soundtrack was not devised for Jailhouse Rock. The title song "Jailhouse Rock" had already been released as a single on September 24, 1957, and went to #1 on the singles chart. The sixth soundtrack song "Treat Me Nice" was not included on the EP, a new recording from September 5 at Radio Recorders was instead placed as the B-side to the "Jailhouse Rock" single where it peaked at #18 on the singles chart independently. The writing and production team of Jerry Leiber and Mike Stoller played prominent roles in the making of the soundtrack, writing four of its songs and working closely with Presley in the studio. Other than both sides of the single and "I Want to Be Free", the fourth song by the pair "(You're So Square) Baby I Don't Care" became a minor standard, receiving cover versions by Buddy Holly, Cliff Richard, Joni Mitchell, and Brian Setzer.

"Don't Leave Me Now" had also appeared on the Loving You (1957) album, but in a different version from an earlier set of recording sessions. Additional original music for the film was composed by producer Jeff Alexander, and the song sung by the Hunk Houghton character, "One Day", was by Roy C. Bennett and Sid Tepper.

Reissues
All five songs from the EP are available on The King of Rock 'n' Roll: The Complete 50s Masters released in 1992. On April 15, 1997, RCA released a compact disc comprising versions appearing in the feature film and versions that had been commercially released on records of the songs from both Jailhouse Rock and Presley's first movie, Love Me Tender. Three tracks were previously unreleased alternate takes, along with two newly mixed stereo versions of "Love Me Tender" and "Poor Boy".

Personnel
The Blue Moon Boys
 Elvis Presley – vocals, acoustic guitar, electric bass on "(You're So Square) Baby I Don't Care"
 Scotty Moore – electric guitar
 Bill Black – double bass, electric bass 
 D. J. Fontana – drums

The Jordanaires
 Gordon Stoker – background vocals
 Neal Matthews – background vocals, double bass (uncertain)
 Hoyt Hawkins – background vocals 
 Hugh Jarrett – background vocals 

Additional personnel 
 Dudley Brooks – piano
 Mike Stoller – piano on "I Want to Be Free"

Track listing

Original release

1997 Compact disc reissue with bonus tracks

References

External links

Elvis Presley EPs
Elvis Presley soundtracks
1957 EPs
Drama film soundtracks
1957 soundtrack albums
RCA Records soundtracks
RCA Records EPs
Albums produced by Jeff Alexander
Albums recorded at Radio Recorders